is a Japanese original anime television series produced by CloverWorks. The series aired from January to April 2022.

Plot
On an artificial island in Tokyo Bay there is a special district commonly known as the 24th Ward, childhood friends Ran, Koki and Shuta hung out together. Their lives changed when their school caught on fire and Koki's sister Asumi was caught inside. They argued about the best way to save her, and instead of working together, Shuta rushed in but was unable to save her life. Now, a year after the incident, they receive visual messages from Asumi presenting them with life-and-death situations in which they have to decide on their course of action. A strange character called Carneades appears and threatens to thrust choices upon the world.

Characters

The blue-haired son of the owner of the "Aoi Bakery" in the 24th ward. He is physically fit with almost superhuman physical abilities. He is known as hero "Mr.24" because he protects the ward. He is a childhood friend of Koki and Ran.

The red-haired leader of the artist group "DoRed" who is active in the 24th Ward. He has a strong personality and conveys his message through graffiti art. He is a childhood friend of Shuta and Koki and the trio are referred to as "RGB" because of their individual hair colors, Red, Green and Blue.

The green-haired son of the famous "Suidou Zaibatsu" in the 24th ward. He is extremely bright and generally has a calm demeanor. He is a childhood friend of Shuta and Ran.

Sister of Koki and childhood friend of her brother, Ran and Shuta whom she called "RGB" because of their hair colors. A year ago, she died getting trapped in a fire at school.

A childhood friend of Ran, Kouki and Shuta, who works on the popular okonomiyaki restaurant "Itadaki" in the 24th Ward and has a puppy called Daisy. 

A friend of Ran and member of the "DoRed" group.

She is the chief researcher of the Central Information Center and manages the Hazard Cast used by SARG which automatically calculates an predicts crime scenes. She also keeps a watchful eye over Koki. 

Koki and Asumi's father and the powerful mayor of the 24th Ward.

Koki and Asumi's mother, and former wife of Gori Suidō and died some years ago. She was a kind-hearted woman who worked as an elementary school teacher and had a strong interest in justice. 

A member of the "DoRed" group and childhood friend of Ran. He wanted to be a graffiti artist but was much better with technology and developed his hacking skills.
Kuchikiri (0th)
A former associate of Kanae Isshiki and later mentor to Ran. He was injured in a car accident and became dyslexic, turning to graffiti art to express himself. Her rejected technology and started a campaign against the KANAE System.

Former teacher at Takara Elementary school who keeps in contact with and takes an interest in the lives of his former students.

Daughter of Hiroki Shirakaba and refused to attend school following the fire in which Asumi was killed.

Hajime Taki
A shady character who works for the large Yabusame corporation which is seeking to buy up land in the 24th Ward prior to its amalgamation with greater Tokyo. His main gang members are called Gutter and Chop.
Howard Win
A wealthy industrialist and developer who plans to demolish shantytown and the 24th ward, then make a fortune from redeveloping it.

Release
On October 24, 2021, CloverWorks announced that it is producing an original anime television series titled Tokyo 24th Ward. The series is directed by Naokatsu Tsuda, with Vio Shimokura writing and overseeing series' scripts, Shuji Sogabe and Kanako Nono designing the characters, Takahiro Kishida adapting those designs for animation, and Hideyuki Fukasawa composing the series' music. It aired from January 6 to April 7, 2022, on Tokyo MX and other networks, with the first episode being a one-hour special. The opening theme song is "Paper Sky" by Survive Said the Prophet, while the ending theme song is "255,255,255" by Junya Enoki, Yuma Uchida, and Kaito Ishikawa. Plus Media Networks Asia licensed the series in Southeast Asia and will release it on Aniplus Asia.

Episode list

Notes

References

External links
Official website 
Official website 

2022 anime television series debuts
Anime with original screenplays
Aniplex
CloverWorks
Crunchyroll anime
Funimation
Television shows set in Tokyo